Wootton Wawen Aqueduct is one of three aqueducts on a 6 km length of the Stratford-upon-Avon Canal in Warwickshire. All are unusual in that the towpaths are at the level of the canal bottom.

This aqueduct is just outside Wootton Wawen, where the canal crosses the A3400 main road. It was built by the Stratford Canal Company in 1813 and is a Grade II* listed structure.

References

External links 

Wooton Wawen (Worcester News)

Buildings and structures in Warwickshire
Navigable aqueducts in England
Bridges in Warwickshire
Canals in Warwickshire
Grade II* listed buildings in Warwickshire
Grade II* listed bridges in England
Cast iron aqueducts